Club Deportivo Pozo Estrecho is a football team based in Pozo Estrecho, Cartagena, Spain. Founded in 1931, the team plays in Preferente Autonómica.

The club's home ground is Rafael García.

Season to season

1 season in Tercera División

External links
Preferente Autonómica
trecera.com profile

Football clubs in the Region of Murcia
Sport in Cartagena, Spain
Association football clubs established in 1931
Divisiones Regionales de Fútbol clubs
1931 establishments in Spain